One Piece (stylized in all caps) is a Japanese manga series written and illustrated by Eiichiro Oda. It has been serialized in Shueisha's shōnen manga magazine Weekly Shōnen Jump since July 1997, with its individual chapters compiled into 105 tankōbon volumes . The story follows the adventures of Monkey D. Luffy, a boy whose body gained the properties of rubber after unintentionally eating a Devil Fruit. With his pirate crew, the Straw Hat Pirates, Luffy explores the Grand Line in search of the deceased King of the Pirates Gol D. Roger's ultimate treasure known as the "One Piece" in order to become the next King of the Pirates.

The manga spawned a media franchise, having been adapted into a festival film produced by Production I.G, and an anime series produced by Toei Animation, which began broadcasting in 1999. Additionally, Toei has developed fourteen animated feature films, one original video animation, and thirteen television specials. Several companies have developed various types of merchandising and media, such as a trading card game and numerous video games. The manga series was licensed for an English language release in North America and the United Kingdom by Viz Media and in Australia by Madman Entertainment. The anime series was licensed by 4Kids Entertainment for an English-language release in North America in 2004 before the license was dropped and subsequently acquired by Funimation in 2007.

One Piece has received praise for its storytelling, world-building, art, characterization, and humor. It has received many awards and is ranked by critics, reviewers, and readers as one of the best manga of all time. Several volumes of the manga have broken publishing records, including the highest initial print run of any book in Japan. In 2015 and 2022, One Piece set the Guinness World Record for "the most copies published for the same comic book series by a single author". It was the best-selling manga for eleven consecutive years from 2008 to 2018, and is the only manga that had an initial print of volumes of above 3 million continuously for more than 10 years, as well as the only that had achieved more than 1 million copies sold in all of its over 100 published tankōbon volumes. One Piece is the only manga whose volumes have ranked first every year in Oricon's weekly comic chart existence since 2008.

, One Piece had over 516.6 million copies in circulation in 61 countries and regions worldwide, making it the best-selling manga series in history, and the best-selling comic series printed in book volume. It is also one of the highest-grossing media franchises of all time.

Synopsis

Setting

The world of One Piece is populated by humans and many other races, such as dwarves, fish-men, and giants. It is covered by two vast oceans, which are divided by a massive mountain range called the Red Line; The Grand Line, a sea that runs perpendicular to the Red Line, further divides them into four seas: North Blue, East Blue, West Blue, and South Blue. Surrounding the Grand Line are two regions called Calm Belts, similar to horse latitudes, which experience almost no wind or ocean currents and are the breeding ground for huge sea creatures called sea kings. Because of this, the calm belts are very effective barriers for those trying to enter the Grand Line. However, navy ships, members of an intergovernmental organization known as the World Government, are able to use a sea-prism stone to mask their presence from the sea kings and can simply pass through the calm belts. All other ships are forced to take a more dangerous route, going through a mountain at the first intersection of the Grand Line and the Red Line, a canal system known as Reverse Mountain. Sea water from each of the four seas runs up that mountain and merges at the top to flow down a fifth canal and into the first half of the Grand Line, called Paradise because how it compared to the second half. The second half of the Grand Line, beyond the second intersection with the Red Line, is known as the New World.

Plot

The series focuses on Monkey D. Luffy, a young man made of rubber, who, inspired by his childhood idol, the powerful pirate Red-Haired Shanks, sets off on a journey from the East Blue Sea to find the mythical treasure, the One Piece, and proclaim himself the King of the Pirates. In an effort to organize his own crew, the Straw Hat Pirates, Luffy rescues and befriends a pirate hunter and swordsman named Roronoa Zoro, and they head off in search of the titular treasure. They are joined in their journey by Nami, a money-obsessed thief and navigator; Usopp, a sniper and compulsive liar; and Sanji, an amorous but chivalrous cook. They acquire a ship, the Going Merry, and engage in confrontations with notorious pirates of the East Blue. As Luffy and his crew set out on their adventures, others join the crew later in the series, including Tony Tony Chopper, an anthropomorphized reindeer doctor; Nico Robin, an archaeologist and former Baroque Works assassin; Franky, a cyborg shipwright; Brook, a skeleton musician and swordsman; and Jimbei, a fish-man helmsman and former member of the Seven Warlords of the Sea. Once the Going Merry is damaged beyond repair, Franky builds the Straw Hat Pirates a new ship, the Thousand Sunny, Together, they encounter other pirates, bounty hunters, criminal organizations, revolutionaries, secret agents, and soldiers of the corrupt World Government, and various other friends and foes, as they sail the seas in pursuit of their dreams.

Production

Concept and creation
Eiichiro Oda's interest in pirates began in his childhood, watching the animated series Vicky the Viking, which inspired him to want to draw a manga series about pirates. The reading of pirate biographies influenced Oda to incorporate the characteristics of real-life pirates into many of the characters in One Piece; for example, the character Marshall D. Teach is based on and named after the historical pirate Edward "Blackbeard" Teach. Apart from the history of piracy, Oda's biggest influence is Akira Toriyama and his series Dragon Ball, which is one of his favorite manga. He was also inspired by The Wizard of Oz, claiming not to endure stories where the reward of adventure is the adventure itself, opting for a story where travel is important, but even more important is the goal.

While working as an assistant to Nobuhiro Watsuki, Oda began writing One Piece in 1996. It started as two one-shot stories entitled Romance Dawn—which would later be used as the title for One Pieces first chapter and volume. They both featured the character of Luffy, and included elements that would appear later in the main series. The first of these short stories was published in August 1996 in Akamaru Jump and later in One Piece Red. The second was published in the 41st issue of Weekly Shōnen Jump in 1996, and reprinted in 1998 in Oda's short story collection, Wanted!. In an interview with TBS, Takanori Asada, the original editor of One Piece, revealed that the manga was rejected by Weekly Shōnen Jump three times before Shueisha agreed to publish the series.

Development
When creating a Devil Fruit, Oda thinks of something that would fulfill a human desire; he added that he does not see why he would draw a Devil Fruit unless the fruit's appearance would entice one to eat it. The names of many special attacks, as well as other concepts in the manga, consist of a form of punning in which phrases written in kanji are paired with an idiosyncratic reading. The names of some characters' techniques are often mixed with other languages, and the names of several of Zoro's sword techniques are designed as jokes; they look fearsome when read by sight but sound like kinds of food when read aloud. For example, Zoro's signature move is Onigiri, which is written as demon cut but is pronounced the same as rice ball in Japanese. Eisaku Inoue, the animation director, has said that the creators did not use these kanji readings in the anime since they "might have cut down the laughs by about half". Nevertheless, Konosuke Uda, the director, said that he believes that the creators "made the anime pretty close to the manga".

Oda was "sensitive" about how his work would be translated. In many instances, the English version of the One Piece manga uses one onomatopoeia for multiple onomatopoeia used in the Japanese version. For instance, "saaa" (the sound of light rain, close to a mist) and "zaaa" (the sound of pouring rain) are both translated as "fshhhhhhh". Unlike other manga artists, Oda draws everything that moves himself to create a consistent look while leaving his staff to draw the backgrounds based on sketches he has drawn. In this way, he wishes to maintain a uniform representation, leaving only the realization of the backgrounds to his staff, based on his sketches. This workload forces him to keep tight production rates, starting from five in the morning until two in the morning the next day, with short breaks only for meals. Oda's work program includes the first three days of the week dedicated to the writing of the storyboard and the remaining time for the definitive inking of the boards and for the possible coloring. When a reader asked who Nami was in love with, Oda replied that there would hardly be any love affairs within Luffy's crew. The author also explained he deliberately avoids including them in One Piece since the series is a shōnen manga and the boys who read it are not interested in love stories.

Conclusion
Oda revealed that he originally planned One Piece to last five years, and that he had already planned the ending. However, he found it would take longer than he had expected as Oda realized that he liked the story too much to end it in that period of time. In 2016, nineteen years after the start of serialization, the author said that the manga has reached 65% of the story he intends to tell. In July 2018, on the occasion of the twenty-first anniversary of One Piece, Oda said that the manga has reached 80% of the plot, while in January 2019, he said that One Piece is on its way to the conclusion, but that it could exceed the 100th volume. In August 2019, Oda said that, according to his predictions, the manga will end between 2024 and 2025. However, Oda stated that the ending would be what he had decided in the beginning; he is committed to seeing it through. In a television special aired in Japan, Oda said he would be willing to change the ending if the fans were to be able to predict it. In August 2020, Shueisha announced in the year's 35th issue of Weekly Shōnen Jump that One Piece was "headed toward the upcoming final saga." On January 4, 2021, One Piece reached its thousandth chapter. In June 2022, Oda announced that the manga would enter a one-month break to prepare for its 25th anniversary and its final saga, set to begin with the release of chapter 1054.

Publication

Main series

Written and illustrated by Eiichiro Oda, One Piece has been serialized by Shueisha in the shōnen manga anthology Weekly Shōnen Jump since July 22, 1997. Shueisha has collected its chapters into individual tankōbon volumes. The first volume was released on December 24, 1997. By March 3, 2023, a total of 105 volumes have been released.

The One Piece manga was licensed for an English language release by Viz Media, who published it via chapters in the manga anthology Shonen Jump, since the magazine's launch in November 2002, and in bound volumes since June 30, 2003. In 2009, Viz announced the release of five volumes per month during the first half of 2010 to catch up with the serialization in Japan. Following the discontinuation of the print Shonen Jump, Viz began releasing One Piece chapterwise in its digital successor Weekly Shonen Jump on January 30, 2012. In the United Kingdom, the volumes were published by Gollancz Manga, starting in March 2006, until Viz Media took it over after the fourteenth volume. In Australia and New Zealand, the English volumes have been distributed by Madman Entertainment since November 10, 2008. In Poland, Japonica Polonica Fantastica is publishing the manga, Glénat in France, Panini Comics in Mexico, LARP Editores and later by Ivrea in Argentina, Planeta de Libros in Spain, Edizioni Star Comics in Italy, and Sangatsu Manga in Finland.

Spin-offs and crossovers
Oda teamed up with Akira Toriyama to create a single crossover of One Piece and Toriyama's Dragon Ball. Entitled Cross Epoch, the one-shot was published in the December 25, 2006, issue of Weekly Shōnen Jump and the April 2011 issue of the English Shonen Jump. Oda collaborated with Mitsutoshi Shimabukuro, author of Toriko, for a crossover one-shot of their series titled , which ran in the April 4, 2011, issue of Weekly Shōnen Jump. The spin-off series , written by Ei Andō in a super deformed art style, began serialization in the January 2015 issue of Saikyō Jump.

Related media

Festival films and original video animation
One Piece: Defeat Him! The Pirate Ganzack! was produced by Production I.G for the 1998 Jump Super Anime Tour and was directed by Gorō Taniguchi. Luffy, Nami, and Zoro are attacked by a sea monster that destroys their boat and separates them. Luffy is found on an island beach, where he saves a little girl, Medaka, from two pirates. All the villagers, including Medaka's father have been abducted by Ganzack and his crew and forced into labor. After hearing that Ganzack also stole all the food, Luffy and Zoro rush out to retrieve it. As they fight the pirates, one of them kidnaps Medaka. A fight starts between Luffy and Ganzack, ending with Luffy's capture. Meanwhile, Zoro is forced to give up after a threat is made to kill all the villagers. They rise up against Ganzack, and while the islanders and pirates fight, Nami unlocks the three captives. Ganzack defeats the rebellion and reveals his armored battleship. The Straw Hat Pirates are forced to fight Ganzack once more to prevent him from destroying the island.

A second film, One Piece: Romance Dawn Story, was produced by Toei Animation in July 2008 for the Jump Super Anime Tour. It is 34 minutes in length and based on the first version of Romance Dawn. It includes the Straw Hat Pirates up to Brook and their second ship, the Thousand Sunny. In search for food for his crew, Luffy arrives at a port after defeating a pirate named Crescent Moon Gally on the way. There he meets a girl named Silk, who was abandoned by attacking pirates as a baby and raised by the mayor. Her upbringing causes her to value the town as her "treasure". The villagers mistake Luffy for Gally and capture him just as the real Gally returns. Gally throws Luffy in the water and plans to destroy the town, but Silk saves him and Luffy pursues Gally. His crew arrives to help him, and with their help he recovers the treasure for the town, acquires food, and destroys Gally's ship. The film was later released as a triple feature DVD with Dragon Ball: Yo! Son Goku and His Friends Return!! and Tegami Bachi: Light and Blue Night, that was available only though a mail-in offer exclusively to Japanese residents.

The One Piece Film Strong World: Episode 0 original video animation adapts the manga's special "Chapter 0", which shows how things were before and after the death of Roger. It received a limited release of three thousand DVDs as a collaboration with the House Foods brand.

TV series

Anime series

Toei Animation produces an anime television series based on the One Piece manga. The series, which premiered on Fuji TV on October 20, 1999, has aired more than 1,000 episodes, and has been exported to various countries around the world. Two cross-over episodes with the anime adaptation of Toriko were aired. The first of these, which was also the first episode of Toriko, aired on April 3, 2011. A second special, which also crossed over with Dragon Ball Z, aired on April 7, 2013.

On June 8, 2004, 4Kids Entertainment acquired the license for distribution of One Piece in North America. 4Kids contracted Viz Media to handle home video distribution. 4Kids' in-house musicians wrote a new background score and theme song nicknamed "Pirate Rap". 4Kids' dub mandated edits for content and length, which reduced the first 143 episodes into 104. Initially, 4Kids originally created an English version of the first opening theme, "We Are!" by Russell Velazquez. It premiered in the United States on September 18, 2004, in first-run syndication on the Fox network as part of the weekend programming block FoxBox TV, and later aired on Cartoon Network on their Saturday night action programming block, Toonami in April 2005. It also aired in other blocks and lineups, such as its Monday-Thursday night prime-time lineup and its Miguzi weekday after-school action block in 2006. Production was halted in 2006 after episode 143/104. Viz also ceased its home video release of the series after volume 11. On July 22, 2010, an interview with Anime News Network and Mark Kirk, senior vice-president of digital media for 4Kids Entertainment, revealed that 4Kids acquired One Piece as part of a package deal with other anime, and that the company did not screen the series before licensing it. However, once 4Kids realized One Piece was not appropriate for their intended demographic, the company decided to edit it into a more child-oriented series until they had an opportunity to legally drop the license. Kirk said the experience of producing One Piece "ruined the company's reputation". Since then, 4Kids established a stricter set of guidelines, checks, and balances to determine which anime the company acquires.

On April 13, 2007, Funimation licensed the series and started production on an English-language release of One Piece. In an interview with voice actor Christopher Sabat, he stated that Funimation had been interested in acquiring One Piece from the very beginning, and produced a "test episode", in which Sabat portrayed the character of Helmeppo and Eric Vale played the part of the main character, Monkey D. Luffy. (They would later go on to provide the English voices for Roronoa Zoro and Sanji, respectively.) After resuming production of the renewed English dub, which featured less censorship because of fewer restrictions on cable programming, Funimation released its first uncut, bilingual DVD box set containing 13 episodes on May 27, 2008. Similarly sized sets followed with fourteen sets released. The Funimation-dubbed episodes premiered on Cartoon Network on September 29, 2007 and aired until its removal on March 22, 2008. On October 28, 2011, Funimation posted a press release on their official website confirming the acquisition of episodes 206–263, and the aspect ratio, beginning with episode 207, would be changed to the 16:9 widescreen format. On May 18, 2013, the uncut series began airing on Adult Swim's revived Toonami late-night programming block from episode 207 onward. One Piece was removed from the Toonami block after March 18, 2017.

In May 2009, Funimation, Toei Animation, Shueisha, and Fuji Television announced they would simulcast stream the series within an hour of the weekly Japanese broadcast at no charge. Originally scheduled to begin on May 30, 2009, with episode 403, a lack of security resulted in a leak of the episode, and Funimation delayed the offer until episode 415 on August 29, 2009. On February 12, 2013, it was announced that Manga Entertainment would start releasing the Funimation dub of One Piece in the United Kingdom in a DVD box set format. Crunchyroll began simulcasting the series on November 2, 2013, for the United States, Canada, South Africa, Australia, New Zealand, and Latin America.

Live-action series

On July 21, 2017, Weekly Shōnen Jump editor-in-chief Hiroyuki Nakano announced that Tomorrow Studios (a partnership between Marty Adelstein and ITV Studios) and Shueisha would commence production of an American live-action television adaptation of Eiichiro Oda's One Piece manga series as part of the series' 20th anniversary celebrations. Eiichiro Oda will serve as executive producer for the series alongside Tomorrow Studios CEO Adelstein and Becky Clements.  The series will reportedly begin with the East Blue arc.

In January 2020, Oda revealed that Netflix ordered a first season consisting of ten episodes. On May 19, 2020, producer Marty Adelstein revealed during an interview with SyFy Wire, that the series was originally set to begin filming in Cape Town sometime around August, but has since been delayed to around September due to COVID-19. He also revealed that, during the same interview, all ten scripts had been written for the series and they were set to begin casting sometime in June. However, executive producer Matt Owens stated in September 2020 that casting had not yet commenced.

In March 2021, production started up again with showrunner Steven Maeda revealing that the series codename is Project Roger. In November 2021, it was announced that the casting for the series includes Iñaki Godoy as Monkey D. Luffy, Mackenyu as Roronoa Zoro, Emily Rudd as Nami, Jacob Romero Gibson as Usopp and Taz Skylar as Sanji. In March 2022, Netflix added Morgan Davies as Koby, Ilia Isorelýs Paulino as Alvida, Aidan Scott as Helmeppo, Jeff Ward as Buggy, McKinley Belcher III as Arlong, Vincent Regan as Garp and Peter Gadiot as Shanks to the cast in recurring roles.

Theatrical films

Fourteen animated theatrical films based on the One Piece series have been released. The films are typically released in March in accordance with the spring vacation of Japanese schools. The films feature self-contained, completely original plots, or alternate retellings of story arcs with animation of a higher quality than what the weekly anime allows. The first three films were typically double features paired up with other anime films, and were thus, usually an hour or less in length. The films themselves offer contradictions in both chronology and design that make them incompatible with a single continuity. Funimation has licensed the eighth, tenth, and twelfth films for release in North America, and these films have received in-house dubs by the company.

Video games

The One Piece franchise has been adapted into multiple video games published by subsidiaries of Bandai and later as part of Bandai Namco Entertainment. The games have been released on a variety of video game, handheld consoles, and mobile devices. The video games feature role-playing games, and fighting games, such as the titles of the Grand Battle! meta-series. The series debuted on July 19, 2000, with From TV Animation – One Piece: Become the Pirate King!. Over forty games have been produced based on the franchise. Additionally, One Piece characters and settings have appeared in various Shonen Jump crossover games, such as Battle Stadium D.O.N, Jump Super Stars, Jump Ultimate Stars, J-Stars Victory VS and Jump Force.

Music

Music soundtracks have been released that are based on songs that premiered in the series. Kohei Tanaka and Shiro Hamaguchi composed the score for One Piece. Various theme songs and character songs were released on a total of 51 singles. Eight compilation albums and seventeen soundtrack CDs have been released featuring songs and themes that were introduced in the series. On August 11, 2019, it was announced that the musical group Sakuramen is collaborating with Kohei Tanaka to compose music for the anime's "Wano Country" story arc.

Light novels
A series of light novels was published based on the first festival film, certain episodes of the anime television series, and all but the first feature film. They feature artwork by Oda and are written by Tatsuya Hamasaki. The first of these novels, One Piece: Defeat The Pirate Ganzak! was released on June 3, 1999. One Piece: Logue Town Chapter followed on July 17, 2000, as an adaptation of the anime television series' Logue Town story arc. The first feature film to be adapted was Clockwork Island Adventure on March 19, 2001. The second, and so far last, light novel adaptation of an anime television series arc, One Piece: Thousand-year Dragon Legend, was published on December 25, 2001. The adaptation of Chopper's Kingdom on the Island of Strange Animals was released on March 22, 2002, and that of Dead End Adventure on March 10, 2003. Curse of the Sacred Sword followed on March 22, 2004, and Baron Omatsuri and the Secret Island on March 14, 2005. The light novel of The Giant Mechanical Soldier of Karakuri Castle was released on March 6, 2006, and that of The Desert Princess and the Pirates: Adventures in Alabasta on March 7, 2007. The newest novel adapts Episodes of Chopper Plus: Bloom in the Winter, Miracle Cherry Blossom and was released on February 25, 2008.

Art and guidebooks
Five art books and five guidebooks for the One Piece series have been released. The first art book, One Piece: Color Walk 1, released June 2001, was also released in English by Viz Media on November 8, 2005. A second art book, One Piece: Color Walk 2, was released on November 4, 2003; and One Piece: Color Walk 3 – Lion the third art book, was released January 5, 2006. The fourth art book, subtitled Eagle, was released on March 4, 2010, and One Piece: Shark, the fifth art book, was released on December 3, 2010.

The first guidebook One Piece: Red – Grand Characters was released on March 2, 2002. The second, One Piece: Blue – Grand Data File, followed on August 2, 2002. The third guidebook, One Piece: Yellow – Grand Elements, was released on April 4, 2007, and the fourth, One Piece: Green – Secret Pieces, followed on November 4, 2010. An anime guidebook, One Piece: Rainbow!, was released on May 1, 2007, and covers the first eight years of the TV anime.

Other media
Other One Piece media include a trading card game by Bandai called One Piece CCG and a drama CD centering on the character of Nefertari Vivi released by Avex Trax on December 26, 2002. A Hello Kitty-inspired Chopper was used for several pieces of merchandise as a collaboration between One Piece and Hello Kitty. A kabuki play inspired by One Piece ran at Tokyo's Shinbashi Enbujō throughout October and November 2015.

An event called "One Piece Premier Show" debuted at Universal Studios Japan in 2007. The event has been held at the same location every year since 2010. (except in 2020, when the event was canceled due to the COVID-19 pandemic). By 2018, the event has attracted over 1 million visitors. The Baratie restaurant, modeled after the restaurant of the same name in the manga, opened in June 2013 at the Fuji Television headquarters. An indoor theme park located inside the Tokyo Tower called the Tokyo One Piece Tower, which includes some attractions, shops and restaurants, opened on March 13, 2015.

One Piece is the first-ever manga series to hold a "Dome Tour", in which events were held from March 25–27, 2011, at the Kyocera Dome in Osaka, and from April 27 – May 1 of the same year at the Tokyo Dome. In 2014, the first One Piece exhibition in South Korea was held at the War Memorial of Korea, and the second exhibition in Hongik Daehango Art Center. In 2015, a One Piece trompe-l'œil exhibition was held at the Hong Kong 3D Museum.

Reception

Sales
One Piece is the best-selling manga series in history; in 2012, Oricon, a Japanese company that began its own annual manga sales ranking chart in year 2008, reported that the series was the first to sell 100 million copies (the company does not report on sales figures before April 2008). The series had over 300 million copies in circulation by November 2013; it had over 440 million copies in circulation worldwide by May 2018; 460 million copies by December 2019; 470 million copies by April 2020; 480 million copies in circulation in forty-three countries worldwide by February 2021. It reached 490 million copies in print worldwide by July 2021. By August 2022, the manga had reached 516,566,000 million copies in circulation worldwide.

One Piece was the best-selling manga series for eleven consecutive years from 2008 until 2018. In 2019, the manga did not top the chart for the first time in twelve years, ranking second in the annual manga sales ranking with over 10.1 million copies sold, although it remained as the best-selling manga by volume in its twelfth consecutive year. It was the third best-selling manga series in 2020, with over 7.7 million copies sold, while volumes 95–97 were the 23rd–25th best-selling manga volumes of 2020, behind the first twenty-two volumes of Demon Slayer: Kimetsu no Yaiba. In 2021, it was the sixth best selling manga with over 7 million copies sold, while volumes 98, 99, and 100 were the sixth, eighth, and ninth best-selling manga volumes, respectively. It was the fourth best-selling manga series in 2022, with over 10.3 million copies sold; volumes 101–104 were among the 10 best-selling manga volumes of the year.

Individual volumes of One Piece have broken publishing and sales records in Japan. In 2009, the 56th volume had a print run of 2.85 million, the highest initial print run of any manga by then. The 57th volume had a print run of 3 million in 2010, a record that was broken several times by subsequent volumes. The 60th volume had a first print run of 3.4 million and was the first book to sell over two million copies in its opening week on Oricon book rankings, and later became the first book to sell over three million copies in Oricon's history. In 2012, the 67th volume had an initial print run of 4.05 million, holding the record of the volume with the highest number of copies in the first print. One Piece is the only manga that had an initial print of volumes of above 3 million continuously for more than ten years. In September 2021, it was reported that of the one-hundred volumes published by then, each one had sold over 1 million copies. Additionally, One Piece is the only work whose volumes have ranked first every year in Oricon's weekly comic chart existence since 2008.

One Piece has also sold well in North America, charting on Publishers Weeklys list of best-selling comics for April/May 2007 and numerous times on The New York Times Manga Best Seller list. On ICv2s list of Top 25 Manga Properties Fall 2008 for North America, which is compiled by interviews with retailers and distributors, Nielsen BookScan's Top 20 Lists of graphic novels and ICv2s own analysis of information provided by Diamond Comic Distributors, One Piece came in 15th place. It rose to second place on their Top 25 Manga Properties Q3 2010 list. By August 2022, the manga has sold 2.9 million copies in print in North America (including single volumes and omnibus editions).

In France, One Piece has been the best-selling manga since 2011, with over 31.80 million copies sold by August 2022. The manga is very popular in the country, where its sales alone represent 8.5% of the French manga market by 2021. The first volume had sold more than 1 million copies in France by July 2021. The 100th volume had one of the biggest initial prints ever for a manga in the French market, selling 131,270 copies in just three days, the best-selling manga volume in a week in the country. The manga sold 6,011,536 copies in 2021. This amount represents almost 20% of the total sales in the country; almost one in five volumes of the series was sold in the year.

In Italy, One Piece had 18 million copies in circulation by April 2021. which represents around 22.5% of the series market outside Japan. In September 2021, the limited edition of the ninety-eighth volume ranked first in the best-selling books weekly ranking, making it the first time that a manga reaches that achievement.

In Germany, One Piece is the second best-selling manga behind Dragon Ball. The manga had sold 6.7 million copies in the country.

Critical response
Allen Divers of Anime News Network comments in 2003 that the art style One Piece employs "initially seems very cartoonish with much of the character designs showing more North American influence than that from its Japanese origins", adding that the "artwork and settings come across as timeless in their presentation". He also notes that the influence of Akira Toriyama (Dragon Ball) shines through in Oda's style of writing with its "huge epic battles punctuated by a lot of humor" and that, in One Piece, he "manages to share a rich tale without getting bogged down by overly complicated plots". Rebecca Silverman of the same site stated that one of the series' strengths is to "blend action, humor, and heavy fare together" and praised the art, but stated that the panels could get too crowded for easy reading. The website activeAnime describes the artwork in One Piece as "wonderfully quirky and full of expression". Splashcomics comments that Oda's "pleasantly bright and dynamic" art style suits the story's "funny and exciting" atmosphere. Isaiah Colbert of Kotaku called One Piece a "masterpiece", highlighting Oda's character writing, world-building and the balance between "fun and serious subject matter". Dale Bashir of IGN wrote that One Piece is more about the world-building, adventuring, and the meaning of freedom instead of the "usual shonen battling" from series like Dragon Ball and Naruto. Bashir concluded: "While not everyone would want to go so far for a franchise that isn’t even finished yet, trust me when I say that it is definitely worth it."

EX Media lauds Oda's art for its "crispy" monochrome pictures, "great use of subtle shade changes" on color pages, "sometimes exquisite" use of angles, and for its consistency. Shaenon K. Garrity, who at some point edited the series for English Shonen Jump, said that, while doing so, her amazement over Oda's craft grew steadily. She states that "he has a natural, playful mastery of the often restrictive weekly-manga format," notes that "interesting things [are] going on deep in the narrative structure," and recommends "sticking through to the later volumes to see just how crazy and Peter Max-y the art gets". Mania Entertainment writer Jarred Pine commented: "One Piece is a fun adventure story, with an ensemble cast that is continuing to develop, with great action and character drama." He praised Oda's artwork as "imaginative and creative" and commented that "Oda's imagination just oozes all of the panels ". He also noted that "Oda's panel work [...] features a lot of interesting perspectives and direction, especially during the explosive action sequences which are always a blast".

In March 2021, Mobile Suit Gundams creator, Yoshiyuki Tomino, said in his interview that One Piece is the "only manga to trust". He praised the manga, commenting: "Still, we are working in the same studio and I saw storyboards near the photocopier. Unlike mine, those storyboards are good. But, you know, among the popular manga there is manga with very beautiful art and manga with bad art, but interesting nonetheless. And I don't trust manga with very beautiful art unless it is One Piece.

After the release of the hundredth volume, Weekly Shonen Jumps editor-in-chief, Hiroyuki Nakano, explained how One Piece changed the history of manga and the way of making it. Nakano said that Weekly Shonen Jump is "a game of weekly popularity", and before One Piece, he aimed for something "interesting this week without thinking about the next"; however, the series reached overwhelming popularity due to its style that involves a story concept and detailed hints, adding that the series had a huge impact on other series. Nakano lauded Oda for his "overwhelming passion, talent and power" and his "unwavering will" to deliver a story to boys and girls, adding that he goes far beyond the reader's expectations, with the belief in "don't fool the reader" and "there is something interesting ahead of it".

Merchandise

Awards and accolades
One Piece was nominated for the 23rd Kodansha Manga Award in the shōnen category in 1999. It was a finalist for the Tezuka Osamu Cultural Prize three times in a row from 2000 to 2002, with the highest number of fan nominations in the first two years. The manga was nominated for Favorite Manga Series in Nickelodeon Magazines 2009 Comics Awards. In 2012, the series won the 41st Japan Cartoonists Association Award Grand Prize, alongside Kimuchi Yokoyama's Neko Darake. In 2014, the series received the 18th Yomiuri Advertising Award's Golden Medal. It also won the 34th Newspaper Advertising Award in the Advertising category and the 67th Advertising Dentsu Award in Newspaper Advertising Planning category.

The forty-sixth volume of One Piece was the best manga of 2007, according to the Oricon's Japanese Book of the Year Action Committee. The series was chosen as one of the best continuing manga for all ages/teens in 2011 by critics from About.com, Anime News Network, and ComicsAlliance. The series has ranked on the "Book of the Year" list from Media Factory's Da Vinci magazine, where professional book reviewers, bookstore employees, and Da Vinci readers participate; it ranked fifth in 2011; second in 2012; third in 2013; second in 2014, 2015 and 2016; third in 2017 and 2018; second in 2019; third in 2020 and 2021; and second in 2022. It ranked eighth in the 2023 edition of Takarajimasha's Kono Manga ga Sugoi! list of best manga for male readers.

The German translation of the manga won the Sondermann Award in the international manga category in 2005. The series received the award for the forty-fourth volume in 2008 and the forty-eighth volume in 2009. One Piece won the AnimeLands Anime & Manga 19th Grand Prix for the "Best Classic Shōnen" category in 2012.

In a poll conducted by Oricon in 2008 about "the most moving (touching) manga ever", One Piece ranked first in both male and female categories. In another 2008 poll by Oricon, Japanese teenagers voted it the most interesting manga. On Tencent's anime and manga web portal, One Piece ranked first in a poll of "must-read manga for the younger generation in China". In a poll conducted by eBookJapan in 2014 about "manga that children want to read" for "Children's Reading Day" by the Ministry of Education, Culture, Sports, Science and Technology, the series also ranked first.

On June 15, 2015, it was announced that Eiichiro Oda and One Piece had set the Guinness World Record for "The most copies published for the same comic book series by a single author" with 320,866,000 copies printed worldwide by December 2014; it updated the record on August 4, 2022, when it reached over 500 million copies in circulation worldwide in both print and digital copies (416,566,000 in Japan and 100 million copies in 60 countries and territories outside of Japan). The series ranked fourth on the first annual Tsutaya Comic Awards' All-Time Best Section in 2017. In 2021, TV Asahi announced the results of its "Manga General Election" poll in which 150,000 people voted for their "Most Favorite Manga", One Piece ranked first on the list.

In 2014, the "One Piece Premiere Summer" event received the "Best Overall Production" award from the International Association of Amusement Parks and Attractions.

Cultural impact
At the 2020 Tokyo Olympics, Greek athlete Miltiadis Tentoglou performed a "Gear Second" pose before winning a gold medal in the men's long jump competition. A gene in the fruit fly (Drosophila melanogaster) was named "Baramicin", partly taking inspiration from the One Piece character Buggy. The gene encodes a protein that is split up into multiple parts.

Notes
Japanese names

References

Further reading

External links

 Official website 
 Official manga website of Weekly Shōnen Jump 
 Official manga website of Viz Media
 Official website of Madman Entertainment
 

 
1997 manga
Adventure anime and manga
Bandai brands
Cyborg comics
Dinosaurs in anime and manga
Fantasy anime and manga
Fiction about size change
Japanese mythology in anime and manga
Manga adapted into films
Mermaids in popular culture
Pirates in anime and manga
Pirate comics
Shueisha franchises
Shueisha manga
Shōnen manga
Viz Media manga
Viz Media novels
War in anime and manga
World record holders